King Peak (sometimes called Mount King) is the fourth-highest mountain in Canada and the ninth-highest peak in North America. Situated just west of Mount Logan (highest in Canada), in Yukon, it is considered a satellite peak of the massive mountain.

Climbing history 
The first ascent of King Peak was made in 1952 by some students from the University of Alaska. Russell Alston Paige, Keith Hart, Elton Thayer and Bill Atwood walked to the Ogilvie Glacier at the foot of Quartz Ridge where the majority of their supplies had been air dropped. They reached Camp 2 on the west ridge on June 3. After waiting two days for a storm to subside, Hart and Thayer set out for the summit while Atwood remained in camp due to a knee injury. After struggling with rock towers and icy crests, they reached the top on June 6, 1952.

The second and third ascents were also completed in 1952 by an American team who had also just made the first ascent of Mount Augusta. From the south side of King Peak, they made their way up to the east ridge occasionally traversing to the north side to avoid steep slopes. After two failed summit attempts on July 20 and 21, Pete Schoening and Gibson Reynolds succeeded in negotiating the gendarme that had rebuffed the failed attempts and reached the top on July 23. Schoening returned the next day with Dick McGowan and Bill Niendorff to complete the third ascent.

See also

List of mountain peaks of North America
List of mountain peaks of Canada

Bibliography

References

External links

 Photo of King Peak

Five-thousanders of Yukon
Saint Elias Mountains